Borownica refers to the following places in Poland:

 Borownica, Lublin Voivodeship
 Borownica, Podkarpackie Voivodeship